George A. Brown Jr. (born November 14, 1948) is an American politician serving as a member of the Kentucky House of Representatives from the 77th district. Elected in November 2014, he assumed office on January 1, 2015.

Early life and education 
Brown was born in Lexington, Kentucky. He earned a Bachelor of Science degree in business administration from Tennessee State University.

Career 
Outside of politics, Brown has worked for the University of Kentucky Facilities Management Department. He was elected to the Kentucky House of Representatives in November 2014 and assumed office on January 1, 2015.

References 

Living people
People from Lexington, Kentucky
Politicians from Lexington, Kentucky
Tennessee State University alumni
Democratic Party members of the Kentucky House of Representatives
1948 births